Megacephala baxteri is a species of tiger beetle in the subfamily Cicindelinae that was described by Henry Walter Bates in 1886.

References

baxteri
Beetles described in 1886